The United Arab Emirates is installing nuclear-powered plants to meet their electricity demand, which is estimated to increase from 15 GWe to over 40 GWe in 2020. In December 2009, the USA and UAE signed a Section 123 Agreement for peaceful nuclear cooperation. The UAE has also signed Nuclear Non-Proliferation Treaty (NPT), along with the additional protocol.

Nuclear Regulation in the UAE 
In April 2008, the UAE Government officially announced its interest in evaluating nuclear energy as an additional source to meet the country’s growing energy demands.

The Policy of the United Arab Emirates on the Evaluation and Potential Development of Peaceful Nuclear Energy, otherwise known as the Nuclear Policy concluded that nuclear power emerged as a proven, environmentally promising and commercially competitive energy source compared to other options.

The Nuclear Policy also emphasised the establishment of an independent, vigilant and effective regulatory body as being the cornerstone of a stable, credible, safe, and secure nuclear programme.
	
The Federal Authority for Nuclear Regulation (FANR) was established on 24 September 2009 in accordance with the Federal Law by Decree No. 6 of 2009, Concerning the Peaceful Uses of Nuclear Energy, also known as the Nuclear Law.

From its headquarters in Abu Dhabi, FANR regulates the nuclear sector in the UAE in line with the Nuclear Policy, international treaties such as the Treaty on the Non-Proliferation of Nuclear Weapons (NPT), other agreements the UAE is a party to, and international best practices.

The U.S.–UAE 123 Agreement for Peaceful Civilian Nuclear Energy Cooperation has allowed nuclear technology transfer from the United States of America, and has been called the 'gold standard' of such transfer agreements.

Barakah nuclear power plant 

The Barakah nuclear power plant is United Arab Emirates's first nuclear power station.  It began construction in 2012, and four APR-1400 nuclear reactors were planned to start operation successively between 2017 and 2020. As of 19 August 2020, the first unit generated power to the UAE grid, and the total project was 94% complete.

In December 2009, Emirates Nuclear Energy Corporation (ENEC) awarded a coalition led by Korea Electric Power Corporation (KEPCO) a $20 billion bid to build the first nuclear power plant in the UAE. Barakah, about 50 km west of Ruwais, was chosen as the site.
In 2011 Bloomberg reported that following detailed finance agreements, the build cost was put at $30 billion: $10 billion equity, $10 billion export-credit agency debt, and $10 billion from bank and sovereign debt. South Korea may earn a further $20 billion from operation, maintenance and fuel supply contracts.  However, a later Bloomberg report indicates the price as $25 billion.

See also

 U.S.–UAE 123 Agreement for Peaceful Civilian Nuclear Energy Cooperation
 Energy in the United Arab Emirates

References

External links
 

UAE's Federal Authority for Nuclear Regulation The website of UAE's nuclear regulation authority